Mylabris flexuosa is a species of blister beetle, belonging to the Meloidae family.

Distribution and habitat
This species is present in Southern Europe (Andorra, France, Italy, Spain and Switzerland), in Russia and in Central Asia. It mainly inhabits prairies.

Description
Head, antennae, pronotum and legs are black, while elytra show yellow and black bands and markings. It has an extensive and easily seen pubescence.

This species is similar to Mylabris variabilis.

Bibliography
Bologna, M.A., Cobolli Sbordoni, M., De Mattheis, E. & Mattoccia, M. (1988) Divergenza genetica tra popolazioni sud europee di Mylabris flexuosa Olivier (Coleoptera, Meloidae). Atti XV Congresso Nazionale Italiano di Entomologia, L’Aquila, 1988, 673–680.

References

External links
 
 
 Le Monde des Insectes
 INPN
 Natura Mediterraneo
 Insectarium virtual

Meloidae
Beetles described in 1811